Tamara Zidanšek was the defending champion, and successfully defended her title, defeating Sara Sorribes Tormo in the final, 7–5, 7–5.

Seeds

Draw

Finals

Top half

Bottom half

References

External Links
Main Draw

Croatian Bol Ladies Open
Bol Open - Singles